Sainty is a surname. Notable people with the surname include:

Guy Stair Sainty (born 1950), art dealer and author on royal genealogy and heraldry
John Sainty (civil servant), English civil servant
John Sainty (footballer), former professional football player and manager
Marilyn Sainty (born 1947), New Zealand fashion and furniture designer
Russ Sainty (1936–2021), English pop singer

See also
Jiangsu Sainty F.C., Chinese football club